Wendy Line is a female English international lawn and indoor bowler.

Bowls career
Line only started bowling at the age of 40 but won a bronze medal in the pairs at the 1988 World Outdoor Bowls Championship in Auckland.

Her greatest achievement came in the 1986 Commonwealth Games in Auckland when she won the gold medal in the women's singles. She represented England in the singles event, at the 1990 Commonwealth Games in Auckland, New Zealand and four years later represented England in the fours event, at the 1994 Commonwealth Games in Victoria, British Columbia, Canada.

Personal life
She is married to fellow international bowler Peter Line.

References

English female bowls players
Living people
Commonwealth Games medallists in lawn bowls
Commonwealth Games gold medallists for England
Year of birth missing (living people)
Bowls players at the 1986 Commonwealth Games
Medallists at the 1986 Commonwealth Games